Elections to Broxtowe Borough Council were held on 5 May 2011 to elect all 44 members to the Council.

The Conservative party held overall control of the council from its foundation in 1973 until 1995 when the Labour party took control. The 2003 election saw Labour lose overall control of the council. Since 2003 the council has been under no overall control with Labour and the Liberal Democrats sharing power.

The previous whole-council election was held in 2007 and the results were: Conservative 16, Liberal Democrats 15, Labour 10 (including the results of a delayed election), Independent 2, British National Party 1. The Conservatives have the largest representation on the council and in a by-election in 2009 gained the one seat the BNP won in 2007.

No boundary changes (to the borough's wards) took place between the 2007 and 2011 elections.

Overall Election result

A total of 44 councillors were elected from 21 Wards.  The council remained no overall control, with the Conservatives remaining the largest party. The Labour party took seats from the Liberal Democrats and became the second largest party on the council.

|}

Gains/losses compared to the 2007 results.

Broxtowe Borough Council - Results by Ward

Attenborough

Awsworth

Beeston Central

Beeston North

Beeston Rylands

Beeston West

Bramcote

Brinsley

Chilwell East

Chilwell West

Cossall & Kimberley

Eastwood North & Greasley (Beauvale)

Eastwood South

Greasley (Giltbrook & Newthorpe)

Nuthall East & Strelley

Nuthall West & Greasley (Watnall)

Stapleford North

Stapleford South East

Stapleford South West

Toton & Chilwell Meadows

Trowell

By-Elections between May 2011 - May 2015

By-elections are called when a representative Councillor resigns or dies, so are unpredictable.  A by-election is held to fill a political office that has become vacant between the scheduled elections.

Toton and Chilwell Meadows - 15 March 2012

Toton and Chilwell Meadows - 11 December 2014

See also
2011 United Kingdom local elections
2011 United Kingdom Alternative Vote referendum
Broxtowe local elections

External links
Broxtowe Borough Council 2011 results

References

2011
2011 English local elections
2010s in Nottinghamshire
May 2011 events in the United Kingdom